Diego Bonavina (born 20 October 1965 in Morciano di Romagna) is an Italian retired footballer. He played as a midfielder. He played for Dolo, Giorgione, Caerano and Mantova before arriving at Treviso where he remained two seasons playing in Serie B and Serie C1. He then played for Padova in Serie C1 and retired in 2000.

In 1994, he has become a lawyer and after retirement he continued to exert this activity. In 1999, he became counselor of Italian Footballers' Association.

Career
1983-1984  Dolo 15 (1) 
1984-1992  Giorgione 180 (16) 
1992-1993  Caerano 32 (3) 
1993-1994  Mantova 13 (0) 
1994-1999  Treviso 153 (28) 
1999-2000  Padova 33 (3)

Notes

External links
 http://www.football.it/schedagiocatore.php?id_giocatore=3092

Living people
Italian footballers
1965 births
Association football midfielders